Habiganj Gas Field is a natural gas field located in Habiganj district of Bangladesh. It is controlled by Bangladesh Gas Fields Company Limited.

Location
Habiganj gas field is located in Madhabpur upazila, Habiganj district, Sylhet division, which is about 100 km northeast of Dhaka. It covers an area of 11 km long and 4.5 km wide.

Discovery 
Pakistan Shell Oil Company discovered the gas field in 1963.

Excavations and wells
From this gas field, ten wells ranging from a depth of 5,100 feet to 11,500 feet were excavated in a vertical way, and another at a depth of 11,552 feet, excavated in a perpendicular way, of which gas was extracted at different times, which are situated 4,357 to 9,910 feet under the ground.

Stock and extraction
It is one of the largest gas fields in the country. According to Petrobangla's estimation, the total reserves of gas extracted is 2,787 billion cubic feet (BCF). The gas extraction was started since 1968, but due to the presence of excessive water, the production of gas was hampered from its four wells; currently, an average of 225 million cubic feet of gas is being extracted daily. At present, the gas field has only 345.5 billion cubic feet of gas remaining.

See also 
List of natural gas fields in Bangladesh
Gas Transmission Company Limited

References 

1963 establishments in East Pakistan
Economy of Sylhet
Natural gas fields in Bangladesh